Icknield High School is a state funded, non-denominational secondary academy school catering for pupils aged between 11 and 16 in Luton, Bedfordshire.

The school ranks 2nd of 21 secondary schools for Progress 8 in the Luton Local Authority. The headteacher is John Noble. Ofstead found the school 'good'

Courses
The school has a specialism in Art . There are 19 courses on offer at GCSE level with four different art qualifications. These are:
Art & Design
Graphics and Digital Media
Textiles
Film

School days
During 1998, Icknield High School was the subject of an ITV documentary titled School Days.  The six-part series took in day-to-day activities around the school, in addition to focusing on a handful of pupils threatened with expulsion from the school.

Academy status
It was announced in late March 2011 that the governing body at the school have taken the contentious decision to fully investigate and explore the possibility of Icknield High School converting to an academy, after much objection from parents and external bodies who felt that the school would operate better under its then current structure. The school formally gained academy status on 1 December 2011.

Notable former pupils
Leon Barnett - a footballer who attended the school from 1997 to 2002, and was a prefect
Steve Dillon - comic book artist
Gavin Shuker - Member of Parliament for Luton South, elected in May 2010.
Jason Wood - comedian
Jamal Lewis - a footballer who currently plays for Newcastle United.

References

 — An account of the £240,000 project in 1999 to build a new art block at the school.
 — A case study of the changes to the school's lunch menu instituted by David Lucas, the school's chef, who was previously a chef at the Savoy Hotel, London.  It is not unusual to see chips, mussels, or pheasant on the menu.
 — A case study of the introduction of broadband technology to the school.
 OFSTED Report.

External links
Official school web site

Islamic clothing controversy in Europe
Secondary schools in Luton
Academies in Luton